Václav Sůva (born 9 December 1949) is a Czech bobsledder. He competed in the two man event at the 1976 Winter Olympics.

References

1949 births
Living people
Czech male bobsledders
Olympic bobsledders of Czechoslovakia
Bobsledders at the 1976 Winter Olympics
Place of birth missing (living people)